Qanat-e Saleh (also Romanized as Qanāt-e Şāleḩ) is a village in Horjand Rural District, Kuhsaran District, Ravar County, Kerman Province, Iran. At the 2006 census, its population was 17, in 4 families.

References 

Populated places in Ravar County